There are at least 101 named lakes and reservoirs in Monroe County, Arkansas.

Lakes
	Barnes Lake, el.  
	Bear Slough, el.  
	Beaver Dam Lake, el.  
	Bellknap Lake, el.  
	Big Baptize Lake, el.  
	Big Cotton Lake, el.  
	Big Eagle Lake, el.  
	Big Weidmann Lake, el.  
	Blue Hole, el.  
	Boggy Lake, el.  
	Browns Shanty Lake, el.  
	Brushy Lake, el.  
	Brushy Lake, el.  
	Brushy Lake, el.  
	Buck Lake, el.  
	Bull Lake, el.  
	Burnt Cypress Lake, el.  
	Clear Lake, el.  
	Cloud Lake, el.  
	Cooter Lake, el.  
	Crab Lake, el.  
	Crosspond Bayou, el.  
	Crowfoot Lake, el.  
	Dodson Lake, el.  
	Eagle Nest Lake, el.  
	Eagle Nest Lake, el.  
	East Lake, el.  
	First Old River, el.  
	Fish Lake, el.  
	Forked Lake, el.  
	Goose Lake, el.  
	Goose Lake, el.  
	Goose Lake, el.  
	Goose Lake, el.  
	Goose Pond, el.  
	Graveyard Lake, el.  
	Green Lake, el.  
	Hart Lake, el.  
	Heifer Lake, el.  
	Hickson Lake, el.  
	Hog Thief Lake, el.  
	Hole in the Wall, el.  
	Horseshoe Lake, el.  
	Horseshoe Lake, el.  
	Horseshoe Lake, el.  
	Ingram Lake, el.  
	Kansas Lake, el.  
	Lambert Bayou, el.  
	Little Baptize Lake, el.  
	Little Cotton Lake, el.  
	Little Eagle Lake, el.  
	Little Long Lake, el.  
	Little Moon Lake, el.  
	Little Weidmann Lake, el.  
	Long Lake, el.  
	Long Lake, el.  
	Long Lake, el.  
	Lost Lake, el.  
	Lower Crooked Lake, el.  
	Lower Eagle Nest Lake, el.  
	Lower Forked Lake, el.  
	Middle Crooked Lake, el.  
	Middle Old River, el.  
	Mill Lake, el.  
	Moon Lake, el.  
	Mud Lake, el.  
	Mud Lake, el.  
	Mule Lake, el.  
	Otter Lake, el.  
	Passmore Lake, el.  
	Pryor Lake, el.  
	Rainbow Lake, el.  
	Red Cat Lake, el.  
	Round Lake, el.  
	Round Pond, el.  
	Round Pond, el.  
	Sandy Slough, el.  
	Section 16 Lake, el.  
	Simpson Lake, el.  
	Slaughters Lake, el.  
	Straight Lake, el.  
	Straight Lake, el.  
	Upper Crooked Lake, el.  
	Upper Eagle Nest Lake, el.  
	Upper Forked Lake, el.  
	Upper Hooked Lake, el.  
	Upper Old River, el.  
	Upper Swan Lake, el.  
	Waters Bayou, el.  
	White Oak Lake, el.  
	Willow Lake, el.  
	Wire Lake, el.

Reservoirs
	Brinkley Lake, el.  
	Caney Slash, el.  
	Carnes Lake, el.  
	Cruthis Lake, el.  
	Lake Greenlee, el.  
	Lake Greenlee Reservoir, el.  
	McCollum Lake, el.  
	Midway Lake, el.  
	Water Bayou Reservoir, el.

See also

 List of lakes in Arkansas

Notes

Bodies of water of Monroe County, Arkansas
Monroe